Altizide is a thiazide diuretic. In combination with spironolactone it is sold under the brand name of Aldactacine and Aldactazine by Pfizer and other names by other companies.

References

Allyl compounds
Benzothiadiazines
Chloroarenes
Diuretics
Thioethers